Moirangthem Govin Singh  (born 3 January 1988 in Tentha, Manipur) is an Indian footballer who plays as a defender for Southern Samity. He has been capped twice for India at senior level. He was part of the Churchill Brothers S.C. squad that won I-League 2008-09.

Singh won the I-League with his former club Churchill Brothers S.C. in season 2008-2009 where he formed a solid defensive partnership alongside Gouramangi Moirangthem.

Career

Churchill Brothers
Singh signed for Churchill Brothers S.C. in 2008 and after 22 games in which Singh played in 16 of them Churchill Brothers S.C. won the I-League championship.

East Bengal
After his one-year stint with Churchill Brothers Singh signed with Kolkata club Kingfisher East Bengal F.C. who also play in the I-League. During his maiden year in Kolkata Singh played in 16 games out of the 26 matches as Kingfisher ended the season in 2nd place.

Salgaocar
After his one-year stay with Kingfisher East Bengal, Singh signed with Goa club Salgaocar S.C. also of the I-League. During his first year with Salgaocar Singh played in only five matches because of his Indian team commitments and because of injury. Even though he was absent from the team Singh was available for the match that won Salgaocar the I-League title. With that victory Govin Singh became the first and only player in I-League history to win the title with more than one club.

United Sikkim
After the season ended Singh made a surprise move by signing for I-League 2nd Division team United Sikkim F.C. for one year.

Eagles
On 5 December 2013 it was announced that Govin has signed up with Eagles F.C. of Kerala on loan for 2013–14 season along with Nadong Bhutia, Bijendra Rai, Avinabo Bag, Jagroop Singh, Bisheshwor Singh, Biswajit Saha and Ramandeep Singh. Moreover, IMG-Reliance, the organisers of the proposed IPL-style football tournament Indian Super League, and Eagles F.C. will facilitate a two to six week training stint for the eight players with UK based Reading F.C. Academy.

Pune City
In July 2015 Singh was drafted to play for FC Pune City in the 2015 Indian Super League.

International
Govin Singh played and started his first match for India against Chinese Taipei on 21 March 2011. He was also included in playing 11 against FC Bayern Munich in Bhaichung Bhutia's farewell match in New Delhi.

Honours

India
 AFC Challenge Cup: 2008
SAFF Championship: 2011

References

External links
 
 

Indian footballers
1988 births
Living people
Meitei people
Footballers from Manipur
East Bengal Club players
2011 AFC Asian Cup players
I-League players
Salgaocar FC players
India international footballers
Churchill Brothers FC Goa players
United Sikkim F.C. players
Shillong Lajong FC players
Royal Wahingdoh FC players
Indian Super League players
Odisha FC players
FC Pune City players
People from Thoubal district
Association football defenders
NEROCA FC players
Aizawl FC players
Southern Samity players